Patrick Zoundi (born 19 July 1982) is a Burkinabé former professional footballer who played as a forward or midfielder.

Club career
Zoundi began his career in the youth academy of Planète Champion. In the summer of 2000, he moved to Europe, joining the Belgian club KSC Lokeren. After five years in Belgium, he signed a contract with Ethnikos Asteras in Greece. After only one season with Ethnikos he signed for Asteras Tripolis, playing two seasons while playing 41 league matches and scoring seven goals.

In July 2008, he signed with Panserraikos in the Greek Super League, before he signed a two-year contract with Fortuna Düsseldorf following a successful trial. He played as striker for Düsseldorf, but could also play in the right midfield or as a right winger.

He then played for Union Berlin before he moved to MSV Duisburg in 2013. He joined 1. FC Saarbrücken a year later.

International career
Zoundi was a member of the Burkina Faso national team's squad at the 2004 African Nations Cup, which finished bottom of its group in the first round of competition, thus failing to secure qualification for the quarterfinals. He has played twelve caps for his country. and represented Burkina Faso at the 1999 FIFA U-17 World Championship in New Zealand.

References

External links
 

1982 births
Living people
Sportspeople from Ouagadougou
Burkinabé footballers
Association football forwards
Association football midfielders
Burkina Faso international footballers
2004 African Cup of Nations players
2010 Africa Cup of Nations players
Belgian Pro League players
Super League Greece players
2. Bundesliga players
3. Liga players
Planète Champion players
K.S.C. Lokeren Oost-Vlaanderen players
Ethnikos Asteras F.C. players
Panserraikos F.C. players
Asteras Tripolis F.C. players
Fortuna Düsseldorf players
1. FC Union Berlin players
MSV Duisburg players
1. FC Saarbrücken players
Burkinabé expatriate footballers
Burkinabé expatriate sportspeople in Belgium
Expatriate footballers in Belgium
Burkinabé expatriate sportspeople in Greece
Expatriate footballers in Greece
Burkinabé expatriate sportspeople in Germany
Expatriate footballers in Germany
21st-century Burkinabé people